Hesycha cribripennis is a species of beetle in the family Cerambycidae. It was described by Léon Fairmaire and Germain in 1859. It is known from Chile.

References

Onciderini
Beetles described in 1859
Endemic fauna of Chile